The Tenor Wore Tapshoes (subtitled "A Liturgical Mystery") is the third book in the St. Germaine mystery series by Mark Schweizer.

In this novel, Chief Koenig investigates the murder of a body discovered half a century after the crime.

External links
 SJMP Books website

2005 American novels

St. Germaine (novel series)
Novels by Mark Schweizer